Cai Griffiths (born 5 January 1984 in Bangor, Wales) is a rugby union player for London Welsh . Griffiths' position of choice is as a Tighthead prop. In December 2012 he rejoined former club Ospreys on loan. On 4 July 2013, it was announced Griffiths to leave Ospreys following loan deal to join London Welsh for the 2013/14 season.

References

External links
Ospreys profile

1984 births
Living people
London Welsh RFC players
Ospreys (rugby union) players
Rugby union players from Bangor, Gwynedd
Welsh rugby union players
London Irish players
Rugby union props